Winter Gardens is a census-designated place (CDP) in San Diego County, California. The population was 20,631 at the 2010 census, up from 19,771 at the 2000 census.

Geography
Winter Gardens is located at  (32.841043, -116.927747).

Demographics

2010
At the 2010 census Winter Gardens had a population of 20,631. The racial makeup of Winter Gardens was 16,845 (81.6%) White, 409 (2.0%) African American, 234 (1.1%) Native American, 345 (1.7%) Asian, 95 (0.5%) Pacific Islander, 1,616 (7.8%) from other races, and 1,087 (5.3%) from two or more races. Hispanic or Latino of any race were 4,289 persons (20.8%).

The census reported that 20,532 people (99.5% of the population) lived in households, 75 (0.4%) lived in non-institutionalized group quarters, and 24 (0.1%) were institutionalized.

There were 7,468 households, 2,759 (36.9%) had children under the age of 18 living in them, 3,696 (49.5%) were opposite-sex married couples living together, 1,050 (14.1%) had a female householder with no husband present, 509 (6.8%) had a male householder with no wife present.  There were 528 (7.1%) unmarried opposite-sex partnerships, and 49 (0.7%) same-sex married couples or partnerships. 1,639 households (21.9%) were one person and 516 (6.9%) had someone living alone who was 65 or older. The average household size was 2.75.  There were 5,255 families (70.4% of households); the average family size was 3.20.

The age distribution was 5,019 people (24.3%) under the age of 18, 1,996 people (9.7%) aged 18 to 24, 5,518 people (26.7%) aged 25 to 44, 5,978 people (29.0%) aged 45 to 64, and 2,120 people (10.3%) who were 65 or older.  The median age was 36.8 years. For every 100 females, there were 97.4 males.  For every 100 females age 18 and over, there were 95.4 males.

There were 7,885 housing units at an average density of 1,779.7 per square mile, of the occupied units 4,264 (57.1%) were owner-occupied and 3,204 (42.9%) were rented. The homeowner vacancy rate was 3.0%; the rental vacancy rate was 5.5%.  11,716 people (56.8% of the population) lived in owner-occupied housing units and 8,816 people (42.7%) lived in rental housing units.

2000
At the 2000 census there were 19,771 people, 7,218 households, and 5,146 families in the CDP. The population density was 4,435.1 inhabitants per square mile (1,711.6/km). The racial makeup of the CDP was 88.39% White, 1.30% African American, 1.00% Native American, 1.36% Asian, 0.28% Pacific Islander, 4.02% from other races, and 3.65% from two or more races. Hispanic or Latino of any race were 12.26%.

Of the 7,218 households 35.3% had children under the age of 18 living with them, 52.7% were married couples living together, 13.3% had a female householder with no husband present, and 28.7% were non-families. 21.1% of households were one person and 7.8% were one person aged 65 or older.  The average household size was 2.72 and the average family size was 3.14.

The age distribution was 26.9% under the age of 18, 9.0% from 18 to 24, 31.3% from 25 to 44, 22.4% from 45 to 64, and 10.3% 65 or older.  The median age was 35 years. For every 100 females, there were 96.6 males.  For every 100 females age 18 and over, there were 94.3 males.

The median household income was $45,791 and the median family income  was $51,378. Males had a median income of $37,226 versus $29,191 for females. The per capita income for the CDP was $19,424.  About 5.9% of families and 8.5% of the population were below the poverty line, including 8.8% of those under age 18 and 2.8% of those age 65 or over.

Government

References

Census-designated places in San Diego County, California
East County (San Diego County)
Census-designated places in California